In algebraic topology, a complex-orientable cohomology theory is a multiplicative cohomology theory E such that the restriction map  is surjective. An element of  that restricts to the canonical generator of the reduced theory  is called a complex orientation. The notion is central to Quillen's work relating cohomology to formal group laws.

If E is an even-graded theory meaning , then E is complex-orientable. This follows from the Atiyah–Hirzebruch spectral sequence. 

Examples:
Complex K-theory, denoted KU, is complex-orientable, as it is even-graded. (Bott periodicity theorem)
Complex cobordism, whose spectrum is denoted by MU, is complex-orientable.

A complex orientation, call it t, gives rise to a formal group law as follows: let m be the multiplication

Viewing
,
let  be the pullback of t along m. It lives in

and one can show, using properties of the tensor product of line bundles, it is a formal group law (e.g., satisfies associativity).

See also 
Chromatic homotopy theory

References 
M. Hopkins, Complex oriented cohomology theory and the language of stacks
J. Lurie, Chromatic Homotopy Theory (252x)

Algebraic topology
Cohomology theories